Poi-dong is a former neighbourhood, dong of Gangnam-gu in Seoul, South Korea until December 31, 2007. It is merged into Gaepo-dong.

References

External links
Gangnam-gu map

Neighbourhoods in Gangnam District